The 5th Arunachal Pradesh Legislative Assembly election was held in 1995.  The Indian National Congress won the popular vote and a majority of seats and Gegong Apang was re-elected as Chief Minister of Arunachal Pradesh.

Voting was staged at 1,728 polling stations. The average number of electors per polling station was 309.

Election Results

Elected Members

References

Arunachal Pradesh
State Assembly elections in Arunachal Pradesh
1990s in Arunachal Pradesh